Never Take No for an Answer is a 1951 British–Italian drama film directed by Maurice Cloche and Ralph Smart and featuring Denis O'Dea, Vittorio Manunta, Guido Celano and Nerio Bernardi. It is based on Paul Gallico's 1951 story The Small Miracle, about an Italian orphan boy who goes to visit the Pope.

Plot
Nine-year-old war orphan Peppino Arrigo lives in the Italian town of Assisi with his donkey, Violetta. The two are devoted to each other and make a living transporting goods for the locals. One night, Violetta falls seriously ill and Peppino runs for the vet, who, on examining her, tells Peppino that he can do nothing to save her and that she may live for only another week or two. Very worried, Peppino takes Violetta to the church of St Francis, hoping that the priests will let him take her down into the crypt to be blessed and cured at the shrine of St Francis, but the priests will not allow it. Only the Holy Father himself could give such permission. So Peppino decides to take the matter to the very top and, leaving Violetta in the loving care of a friend, he sets off alone on an eighty-mile journey to see the Pope in Rome and get that permission. But, when he finally reaches Rome, he finds to his dismay that getting inside the Vatican to see the Pope will be no mean feat. However, Peppino will not take no for an answer...

Production
The screenplay is by Paul and Pauline Gallico, adapted from his 1951 story. Produced by Anthony Havelock-Allan's Constellation Films, it was directed by Maurice Cloche and Ralph Smart, who both also received screenwriter credit. Assisting with production was Prince Alessandro Tasca di Cutò, a Sicilian aristocrat who was cousin of Giuseppe Tomasi di Lampedusa, author of The Leopard. Nino Rota composed the musical score. The film's actors were mostly dubbed in post-production at the Gate Studios in Elstree. In Italy a separate version was released known as Peppino and Violetta. The film was made with financial backing from the NFFC.

Reception
The film was made by the British entirely in Italy, where special permission was granted for filming to take place inside the Vatican itself. Bosley Crowther, in The New York Times, observed that the film is "particularly adroit in the way in which it works in a stunning panorama of religious buildings in Assisi and Rome". The unusual and beautiful backgrounds of Assisi and Rome were also noted by John Fitzgerald of the BBC film program Current Release. The film was BAFTA nominated for Best British Film of 1951.

A remake was produced in 1974 for the Hallmark Hall of Fame television series.

Cast
Vittorio Manunta as Peppino
Denis O'Dea as Father Damico
 Guido Celano as Strotti
 Nerio Bernardi as Father Superior
 Clelia Matania as Mrs. Strotti
 Henri Vidon as Monk
 Frank Coulson as Dr. Bartolo
 Eliso della Vedova as Sergente dei Carabinieri
 Carlo Borelli as Chemist
 Giorgio Riganti as Giuseppe
 Edward Hitchcock as Old Workman
 Roberto Adamina as Gianni
 Riccardo Foti as Monsignor Magana
 John Murphy as Father O'Brien
 Enzo Fiermonte as Sergeant of Swiss Guards
 Dino Nardi as 1st Monsignor

See also
Peppino e Violetta (1951)

References

Bibliography
 Harper, Sue & Porter, Vincent. British Cinema of the 1950s: The Decline of Deference. Oxford University Press, 2007.

External links

Films directed by Ralph Smart
British drama films
1951 drama films
1951 films
Films produced by Anthony Havelock-Allan
British multilingual films
Films directed by Maurice Cloche
1950s multilingual films
British black-and-white films
Films shot at Elstree Studios
Films shot in Rome
Films set in Rome
1950s English-language films
1950s British films